Wahlenbergia ceracea (from the Latin cerae = waxy), commonly known as the waxy bluebell, is a small herbaceous plant in the family Campanulaceae native to eastern Australia.

It blooms in the summer between October and February producing blue-pink-white flowers. It is leafless in its upper parts, and mostly hairless with occasional sparse hairs near the base.

The species is found in New South Wales, Victoria and Tasmania.

References

ceracea
Flora of New South Wales
Flora of Victoria (Australia)
Flora of Tasmania